Amjad Riola Iqbal (born 2 May 1983) is a former footballer who played as a defender or midfielder. Born and raised in England, he earned ten caps with the Pakistan national team.

Club career
Born in Bradford, West Yorkshire, Iqbal started his career at youth level with Bradford City before moving to local non-league club, Thackley in the Northern Counties East Football League and signed for Farsley Celtic in 2002.

Iqbal helped Farsley achieve four promotions in five years, the last promotion being in the 2006–07 season when they were promoted to the Conference National with Iqbal as club captain. Iqbal played 20 consecutive games for Farsley in their 2006–07 promotion season in which they finished in fifth place in the Conference North and beat Hinckley United in the play-off final to earn promotion to the Conference National. He has twice won the Farsley Player of the year award. He remained with Farsley until March 2009, when he rejoined his former manager Lee Sinnott at Bradford Park Avenue.

In August 2010, he returned to Farsley to play for the reformed Farsley AFC in the Northern Counties East Football League.

In 2013, Iqbal joined FC United of Manchester. He played in one league game and one cup game for the club.

International career
Iqbal become Farsley's first international when he received a call up to the Pakistan squad for the 2010 FIFA World Cup qualifying matches against Iraq, in October 2007. Pakistan lost 7–0 on aggregate over two matches, but held Iraq to a nil-nil draw in the second leg. However, Iqbal could not take part in the AFC Challenge Cup 2008 and was not called up for SAFF Cup 2008 due to club and work commitments. He did play in SAFF Cup 2009 for Pakistan after a two-year absence from national team.

Personal life
Iqbal is a British Pakistani and is born to Pakistani parents. Other than being a football player, Iqbal is also a part-time chemistry lecturer at Bradford College. His nickname was Ammers at Farsley.

References

External links

1981 births
Living people
Footballers from Bradford
English footballers
English people of Pakistani descent
Pakistani footballers
Pakistan international footballers
Association football defenders
Association football midfielders
Association football utility players
Bradford City A.F.C. players
Thackley F.C. players
Farsley Celtic A.F.C. players
Bradford (Park Avenue) A.F.C. players
Farsley Celtic F.C. players
F.C. United of Manchester players
National League (English football) players
Northern Premier League players
Northern Counties East Football League players
British sportspeople of Pakistani descent
British Asian footballers